The Sights are a rock and roll band from Detroit, Michigan, formed in 1998. The band has toured in the United States, Canada, and the UK.

Members
Current
Eddie Baranek: Vocals, Guitar
Jarrod Champion: Keyboard, Vocals
Skip Denomme: Drums
Roderick Jones: Saxophone
Liz Mackinder: Vocals
Chrissy Morgan: Vocals
Kyle Schanta: Bass Guitar, Vocals

Former 
Nate Cavalieri (2002-2003): Organ, Vocals
Bobby Emmett (2004-2007): Organ, Piano Bass, Vocals
Keith Fox (2006-2007): Drums
Matt Hatch (2003-2004): Bass Guitar
Dave Knepp (1998-1999): Drums
Dave Lawson (2009-2011): Bass Guitar, Vocals
Mark Leahey (1998-2002): Bass Guitar
David Shettler (2001-2005): Drums, Vocals
Gordon Smith (2009-2011): Keyboard, Vocals
Eugene Strobe (1999-2001): Drums
Dean Tartaglia (2011-2012): Saxophone, Backing Vocals
Mike Trombley (1998, 2005–2006): Drums

Achievements

In 2012, The Sights toured the United States and Europe with Tenacious D.
In 2014, the band's published tour diary, "Taken Alive: The Sights' Rock and Roll Tour Diary," was recognized as one of twenty 2014 Michigan Notable Books by The Library of Michigan. The book includes entries and photographs written and taken for The Detroit Metro Times.

In Popular Culture

 "Left Over Right" was featured in Someone Marry Barry in 2014.
 "Not as Pretty" was featured in The Newsroom in 2013.
 "Just Got Robbed" was featured in National Lampoon in 2009.
 "Just Got Robbed" was featured in Reaper in 2009.
 "Just Got Robbed" was featured in America's Funniest Home Videos in 2008.
 "Circus" was featured in The Shield in 2008.
 "Good Way to Die" was featured in Fast, Inc. in 2006.
 "Waiting on a Friend" was featured in Just Friends in 2005.
 "Circus" was featured in Wedding Crashers in 2005.
 "Sick and Tired" was featured in The Last Chancers in 2002.

Discography

Studio albums
 Are You Green? (1999, Spectator Records; reissued on Fall of Rome Records)
 Got What We Want (2002, Fall of Rome Records)
 The Sights (2005, New Line Records)
 Most of What Follows Is True (2010, Alive Records)
 Left Over Right (2012, Hiros Rise Music)

EPs
 Silver/Gold 12" EP (2009, Lower Peninsula Records)

Compilations 
 Twelve In The Bar (2011, Fountain Records)

References

External links
 Official Website
 Facebook

Musical groups from Detroit
Alive Naturalsound Records artists